Jorhat Institute of Science & Technology, formerly Jorhat Science College is an engineering  college established  in 1971  by the government of Assam. It is located in Sotai, on the outskirts of Jorhat city. It is the first science college of Upper Assam and the third state-government-run engineering college of Assam. It is affiliated to Assam Science and Technology University. It is also the only government engineering college of Assam which offers both engineering and basic science courses.

History 

Jorhat Science College was established by Govt. of Assam in 1971. In 2008, the Government of Assam upgraded the college and renamed it as Jorhat Institute of Science & Technology registered under the Societies Registration Act, 1860. 

The college until then was offering only undergraduate courses in subjects of Science (Honours in Physics, Chemistry and Mathematics). From the academic session 2007-08, a three-year degree course, B.Sc. in Information Technology (IT) was introduced with an intake capacity of 30. From the academic session 2009-10, two technical courses, B.E. in Electronics & Telecommunication (ETC) and Power Electronics & Instrumentation (PEI), were introduced, in addition to the existing B.Sc. courses, with prior approval from AICTE, with an intake of 60 seats in each course. From 2016 onwards, the institute offers B.E. course in Mechanical and Civil Engineering. With the change of affiliation from Dibrugarh University (DU) to Assam Science and Technology University (ASTU), from the session 2017-18, the previous B.E. courses have been changed to B.Tech along with changes in curricula and grading system.

Academics 

The college offers bachelor's courses: Bachelor of Science in Physics, Chemistry, Mathematics and Information Technology, and Bachelor of Technology in the fields of Electronics & Telecommunication Engineering, Power Electronics & Instrumentation Engineering. From academic year 2016-17, the institute has started offering M.Sc. in Physics and Mathematics and B.Tech. in Civil Engineering and Mechanical Engineering. From the academic session 2017-18, JIST introduced M.Sc. in Chemistry with the approval of Dibrugarh University. In 2019, the institution has started PhD courses in Physics, Chemistry and Mathematics with the approval of ASTU.

Formerly, all the courses were affiliated to Dibrugarh University until 2017. From 2017-18 session, the institute is affiliated to Assam Science and Technology University.

Facilities

Computer lab 
The college has a modern computational laboratory with the facilities of many branded PCs connected with each other through LAN. Each core department has its own computing facilities.

Hostels
At present JIST has three boys' hostels and two girls' hostel. The total strength of the boys' hostels is 240 and that of the girls' hostel is 100. Construction of a new girls' hostel is likely to be started. Private hostels and accommodations are also available near the institute campus.

JORBIM Boys' Hostel I is for both B.Sc. and B.Tech students while JIST Boys' Hostel II accommodates only B.Tech students. JIST Boys' Hostel III is for accommodating M.Tech students while the Girls' Hostel has female students of all courses.

Library
JIST has a well-maintained library with more than 11,000 books on different subjects (curriculum and non-curriculum) catering to the needs of the students and teachers. The library is also furnished with scientific journals, monthly magazines and daily newspapers for in-house reading.

Canteen
A college canteen is available with freshly prepared food during breakfast and lunch. It remains open during events at college even if it's not an official working day.

Medical
Medical amenities are available inside the college campus.

Transport
JIST provides for the transportation needs of the students and staff with three buses that run through the heart of Jorhat city.

Training & Placement Cell
The Training & Placement Cell of JIST handles the task of campus recruitment for its graduating students. Established in 2010, the T&P Cell represents the ever-growing roots of JIST. Its tasks involve establishing contacts with companies, conducting workshops for the students to train them on both technical and non-technical aspects, conducting preliminary tests, group discussions, personality development talks and all other kinds of placement-related activities. Equipped with all the facilities, the T&P Cell holds pride in meeting all the requirements of different companies as a part of the placement process. It has provided many jobs to its final year students

Student activities

JORBIM
JORBIM, short for Jorhat Science College (জোৰহাট বিজ্ঞান মহাবিদ্যালয়, in Assamese) is the annual college magazine of JIST. It is a huge legacy of ideas, memories and the latest developments around the world. JORBIM unites culture and technology.

Electronics Hobby Club
Electronics Hobby Club (EHC) is a non-profit and self-governing independent organisation of students as well as alumni of JIST.

The club and its members have excelled in various fields such as autonomous robotics, manual robotics, circuit designs, complex programming using modern microcontrollers and sensor circuitries.

Members have also won various technical competitions conducted at universities and engineering colleges across India, including IIT Bombay, IIT Guwahati, Tezpur University, Nagaland University, and Dibrugarh University

The EHC in its capacity has organised many technical events and seminars at the institute. The club has also coordinated many professional workshops conducted by reputed organisations.

JIST Chemical Society 
JIST Chemical Society is an initiative of the faculty and students of the Chemistry Department. This society lays stress on the all-round development of the students in the field of chemical sciences. It gives importance to interactive sessions, group activities and project presentations.

Photography Club of JIST
The Photography Club of JIST is an initiative of photography loving aspirants to capture all the happenings and activities around the college campus.

JIST Quiz Forum
JIST Quiz Forum organises various quiz competitions every year, the most popular of which is "NERVE BLAST".

Mechanical Hobby Club
It is the technical club of Engineering students of Jorhat Institute of Science & Technology. It was started in the year 2018 by the students of Mechanical Engineering.

The club has the following categories:

 Robotics
 Mechanical Modelling
 Aeromodelling
 Technical Activities
 Cultural
 Coders' League
 Sports
 Literature
 Photography

Abeyaantrix

Abeyaantrix (Assamese: অভিযান্ত্ৰিক্স, Hindi: अभियांत्रिक्ष) is the national-level annual technical festival of Jorhat Institute of Science & Technology. The name is derived from Sanskrit word "अभियांत्रिकी", which means "engineering". The root word is "अभियंता" in Sanskrit/Hindi or "অভিযন্তা" in Assamese, which means "engineer".

Abeyaantrix is one of the best Techno-Cultural fest in North-East India along with Techxetra, Alecheringa, Incandescence.

This is one of the common platforms in North-East India to showcase knowledge and intellect. It is a blend of different technical and cultural events, and has social events as well. Abeyaantrix attracts enthusiasts from various parts of India. It is one of the technical festivals of North-East India which reaches out to both engineering and non-engineering students. It is sometimes abbreviated as Abx on social networking websites. The latest addition, Abeyaantrix-2018, was held in March 2018.

Abeyaantrix was halted by the college authority in 2019 for an indefinite period due to some unforeseen issues that arose in that edition.

Mayaan
Mayaan is the souvenir of Abeyaantrix. It is published annually by team Abeyaantrix to commemorate the events held during the fest. It is usually released at the inauguration ceremony of Abeyaantrix in the presence of the guests. Mayaan contains articles poems and other writing by the students and faculty members of JIST. The souvenir also publishes writings by guest writers.

Mayaan is a Hebrew word which means "fountain". It was chosen to convey "a fountain of knowledge".

Miscellaneous 
Construction of new buildings and renovation efforts are currently underway. However, due to some unforeseen reasons, projects have been delayed by a considerable amount of time. The Hostels are scheduled to be renovated by the end of 2023.

References 

Engineering colleges in Assam
Education in Jorhat district
Colleges affiliated to Dibrugarh University
Universities and colleges in Assam
Educational institutions established in 1971
1971 establishments in Assam